

References 

 
Terms, Philippine